The 7.5 cm Feldkanone 16 neuer Art (7.5 cm FK 16 nA) was a field gun used by Germany in World War II. Originally built as the World War I-era 7.7 cm FK 16, surviving guns in German service were re-barrelled during the early 1930s in the new standard 7.5 cm calibre. It was not modernized for motor towing and retained its original wooden spoked wheels and two crew seats on the face of the gun shield.

See also

References 

 Engelmann, Joachim and Scheibert, Horst. Deutsche Artillerie 1934-1945: Eine Dokumentation in Text, Skizzen und Bildern: Ausrüstung, Gliederung, Ausbildung, Führung, Einsatz. Limburg/Lahn, Germany: C. A. Starke, 1974
 Gander, Terry and Chamberlain, Peter. Weapons of the Third Reich: An Encyclopedic Survey of All Small Arms, Artillery and Special Weapons of the German Land Forces 1939-1945. New York: Doubleday, 1979 
 Hogg, Ian V. German Artillery of World War Two. 2nd corrected edition. Mechanicsville, PA: Stackpole Books, 1997 

World War II field artillery
World War II artillery of Germany
75 mm artillery
Military equipment introduced in the 1930s